The Right Honourable Sir William Anthony Campbell PC, KC (born 30 October 1936) was a Lord Justice of Appeal in Northern Ireland from 1998 to 2008.

Background

Campbell, the son of Harold Campbell CBE, attended Campbell College, Belfast (of which he is now a governor) and Queens' College, Cambridge. Sir Anthony enjoys sailing and is a member of the Royal Ulster Yacht Club. He is an active member of the Church of Ireland.

Law career

In 1960, Campbell was called to the Bar by both Gray's Inn and the Inn of Court of Northern Ireland. He was made a Bencher of the Inn of Court of Northern Ireland in 1983 and a Bencher at Gray's Inn in 1995. Sir Anthony was appointed Queen's Counsel in 1974. He was promoted to the High Court of Justice of Northern Ireland 1988 and served until 1998 when he was further elevated to become a Lord Justice of Appeal. Sir Anthony Campbell retired during the summer of 2008.

Post retirement

In October 2008, Sir Anthony Campbell was appointed to chair the Fingerprint Inquiry, a public inquiry set up by Scottish Government ministers to investigate the steps taken to verify the fingerprints associated with the case of HM Advocate v McKie in 1999, and related matters.  

He served an additional four years as a judge of the Cayman Islands Court of Appeal, retiring from that court in 2014.

References

 

1936 births
Alumni of Queens' College, Cambridge
Living people
Knights Bachelor
Members of Gray's Inn
Members of the Privy Council of the United Kingdom
People educated at Campbell College
Ulster Scots people
Lords Justice of Appeal of Northern Ireland
High Court judges of Northern Ireland
Place of birth missing (living people)
Northern Ireland King's Counsel